The 2009–10 Providence Friars men's basketball team represented Providence College in the Big East Conference. The team finished with a 4–14 conference record and a 12–19 record overall.

Coming off his first season with the team that included a 19–14 record and a win over top-ranked Pittsburgh, coach Keno Davis returned just one starter and only seven players overall for the 2009–10 season. Departing seniors were guard Weyinmi Efejuku, guard Jeff Xavier, forward Jonathan Kale, forward Geoff McDermott, forward Randall Hanke, as well as forwards Chris Baudinet, Brian Beloin, and Connor Heine. Additionally, forward Alex Kellogg transferred to Ohio following two seasons with the Friars. On February 23, with four games remaining in the season, junior guard Kyle Wright left the team to focus on academics.

Statistically, the Friars had the worst scoring defense in Big East history, surrendering 85.3 points per game against conference opponents. Numerous opposing players set career scoring highs in games against the Friars, including 46 points by South Florida guard Dominique Jones in an overtime game on January 23, two points shy of the conference record. On the offensive side of the ball, the Friars averaged 82.4 points per game in the regular season, the fourth-highest average in Division I. They did not receive votes in either the AP Poll or Coaches' Poll at any point in the season.

The Friars began their conference schedule with a 4–4 record, including a home win over #19 Connecticut on January 27. However, this would prove to be the Friars' final win of the season, as the team went on a 10-game losing streak, finishing 15th in the conference before losing to Seton Hall in the first round of the 2010 Big East men's basketball tournament. In the game, forward Jamine Peterson scored 38 points, the second most points in Big East tournament history.

Roster

Depth chart

Incoming recruits

Schedule 

|-
!colspan=9 style=| Exhibition

|-
!colspan=9 style=| Non-conference regular season

|-
!colspan=9 style=| Big East regular season

|-
!colspan=9 style=| Big East tournament

Awards and honors

References

External links
2009–10 Providence Friars men's basketball media guide

Providence Friars men's basketball seasons
Providence Friars
Providence
Providence